The Monaco Music Film Festival is held annually in Monte Carlo. The first festival was held in 2006. The festivals mission is to celebrate film and the music of film. The festival focuses on the International and European premiers of feature films with a strong musical element. The 2007 festival will be held from May 17 to May 19.

2007 honouree 

This year, the festival will be honouring Oscar-winning composer John Barry.

2007 film screenings 

The 2007 festival will include the screening of six European Premier full-length feature films and one short.

Other Monaco film festivals 
The Monaco Music Film Festival is not affiliated with either the Monaco International Film Festival or the Monaco Charity Film Festival.

Film festivals in Monaco
Spring (season) events in Monaco
2006 establishments in Monaco